The fourth series of the British television drama series Ackley Bridge began broadcasting on Channel 4 on 19 April 2021. The series follows the lives of the staff and pupils at the fictional multi-cultural academy school Ackley Bridge College, in the fictitious Yorkshire mill town of Ackley Bridge. When the commissioning of the series was announced, it was announced that Ackley Bridge would face an overhaul, including cast changes, a shortened runtime and a revised timeslot. The series consists of ten thirty-minute episodes, whereas episodes in the previous three series were double the duration. Unlike the first three series, the timeslot was moved to 6pm to appeal to a younger audience. Following the premiere of the first episode on 19 April, the series was made available to stream as a boxset on All 4.

Production and casting

Unlike the second and third series, the renewal of Ackley Bridge was not announced immediately after the conclusion of the series prior. Four months after the conclusion of series three, it was announced that Ackley Bridge had been renewed and would face an overhaul. One of the changes that was made to the programme in the fourth series was the overhaul of the cast. Robyn Cara was cast as Kayla Azfal, a "funny, mixed-race pupil torn between her white mum's family and her traditional Pakistani dad's family", alongside sister Marina Perry, played by Carla Woodcock, who was described by Digital Spy as a "mean girl". Yasmin Al-Khudhairi was cast as Fizza, the best friend of Kayla, and a "fiercely intelligent, fist-in-the-air firebrand". Ryan Dean was cast in the role of Johnny Cooper, "a cocky, good-looking member of the traveller community who is deeply suspicious of school, and who catches the eye of both Kayla and Fizza", and it was also confirmed that Connor McIntyre would guest star as Johnny's grandfather. Tahir Randhawa, played by Shobhit Piasa, also debuted in the fourth series as "the smooth talking billy-liar nephew of Kaneez, whose salesman's patter hides a family secret". The numerous castings came as a result of numerous cast members leaving following the ending of the third series. Jasmine Payne was also cast as Queenie Cooper, as well as Olivia Marie Fearn as Rose Boswell. Original cast member Sunetra Sarker also took on an associate producer role in the fourth series.

In December 2019, it was announced that filming for the fourth series would commence in March 2020, with the commissioning of the series set for September 2020. However, shortly after filming commenced, it was announced that production had been suspended due to the impact of the COVID-19 pandemic on television. The Halifax Courier reported that there would be a minimum of a two-month break, but confirmed that Ackley Bridge "will be back", amidst rumours of the series' cancellation. Later in the year, it was announced that filming would recommence in September, and that it would air in April 2021. A casting call for experienced extras aged 9 to 19 with an Asian background was advertised. It was added by Northern Talent, the casting company, that they would prefer groups of extras from the same household, since it meant that they could interact on set without quarantining beforehand. It was also confirmed that regular cast members would be tested for the virus and placed into "bubbles" in order for them to physically interact with each other on-screen. Producers decided not to incorporate the pandemic into the storylines.

Another of the changes made to Ackley Bridge in this series was the runtime, which was halved from 60 minutes to 30 minutes. Rebecca Holdsworth, Channel 4's commissioning executive, stated that the shortened runtime was to reflect the viewing habits of younger viewers and to give the series "a new look and feel" with the new characters joining. It was later confirmed that the series would air on Channel 4 in 2021, with the ten episodes being broadcast every weekday across two weeks. Unlike the first three series, which aired at 8pm, the timeslot was revised to 6pm. Holdsworth explained that by placing Ackley Bridge in between The Simpsons and Hollyoaks, it would appeal to the younger audiences who watch the respective shows. Following the premiere of the first episode on 19 April, the series was made available to stream as a boxset on All 4. Caroline Hollick, Channel 4's head of drama, wrote that Ackley Bridge is the most-watched series on All 4 by 16-24s, and that the Ackley Bridge hashtag on TikTok had 82 million "hits" at the time of writing. These statistics motivated her to place younger viewers "at the heart of [their] new strategy", which led to the production changes.

Cast

Main

Recurring

Guest

Episodes

References

2021 British television seasons
Series 4